Angela Orebaugh is a cyber technology and security author and researcher. In 2011, she was selected as Booz Allen Hamilton's first Cybersecurity Fellow.  She is an assistant professor at the University of Virginia School of Continuing and Professional Studies, and serves there as the program director for certificates in cybersecurity.

Education
Orebaugh received undergraduate and masters degrees from James Madison University, completing the masters in 1999.  She completed a PhD at George Mason University in 2014 under the direction of Jeremy Allnutt and Jason Kinser.  Her thesis title was Analyzing Instant Messaging Writeprints as a Behavioral Biometric Element of Cybercrime Investigations.

Works
Books
Orebaugh, A. et al. Nmap in the Enterprise, Syngress Publishing, 2008.
Orebaugh, A. et al. How to Cheat at Configuring Open Source Security Tools , Syngress Publishing, 2007.
Orebaugh, A. et al. Wireshark & Ethereal Network Protocol Analyzer Toolkit, Syngress Publishing, 2006.
Orebaugh, A., Biles, S., Babbin, J., Snort Cookbook, OReilly Publishing, 2005.
Orebaugh, A., Rash, M., Babbin, J. and Pinkard, B., Intrusion Prevention and Active Response: Deploying Network and Host IPS, Syngress Publishing, 2005.
Orebaugh, A., Ethereal Packet Sniffing, Syngress Publishing, Boston, MA., 2004.

NIST Publications

NIST Information Security Continuous Monitoring (ISCM) for Federal Information Systems and Organizations. Special Publication 800-137, 2011.
NIST Technical Guide to Information Security Testing and Assessment, Special Publication 800-115, 2008.
NIST Guide to SSL VPNs, Special Publication 800-113, 2008.
NIST Guide to IPSEC VPNs. Special Publication 800-77, 2005.

Article

, (with Ed Covert)

References

Writers about computer security
American computer scientists
Living people
Year of birth missing (living people)
American technology writers
People from Virginia
American women computer scientists
James Madison University alumni
George Mason University alumni
Harvard University alumni
People associated with computer security
University of Virginia faculty
American women academics
21st-century American women